Tsegi Canyon is a canyon in Navajo County, Arizona. Tsegi, meaning in between the rocks, is a Navajo descriptive term for deep canyons with sheer walls. The canyon mouth is located at elevation of  near Marsh Pass.

References

Canyons and gorges of Arizona
Landforms of Navajo County, Arizona
Geography of the Navajo Nation
Colorado Plateau
Old Spanish Trail (trade route)